Katherine Evangeline "Katie" Johnson - Stone (born 1986 in Taipei, Taiwan) is an American actress and writer best known for her work on Shooter. She began her career as fine art model for photographer David LaChapelle.

LaChapelle's first photograph to include Johnson, a group shot with other models, The Deluge, was used on the cover of French art photography magazine Photo Magazine in 2007. Stone also modeled for LaChapelle's fine art projects Auguries of Innocence, Bliss Amongst Chaos, Awakened, and The Raft, which was shot on location at LaChapelle's sustainable living ranch in Hana-Maui, Hawaii. LaChapelle cast Stone as the star of his "anti-commercial" ten-minute long art film and international campaign for Swedish brand Happy Socks, Happy Accidents: The Exorsocks, and is seen on select bottles Castellare di Castellina red wine.

Stone also was the model for photographer Brooke Shaden's "The Re-Imaging of Ophelia" series of images, one of which was used as cover art for Dot Hutchison's young adult novel "A Wounded Name". Stone was a nominee for the Shorty Awards "Best Actress" 2014, and is a contributing author with CreativeLIVE. She plays Becky in 5-Second Films "Dude Bro Party Massacre III" which was called, "Extremely well-made. The film's pacing, comedic timing, and sense of visual comedy are some of the best I've seen in a comedy this century." She volunteers her time and image with Pin-ups for Vets, a non-profit where models dress as World War II-style pin-up girls to raise funds for wounded veterans and deployed troops. She danced professionally with Vaud and the Villains, where she met her husband, drummer and classical percussionist, Nick Stone.  She also performs regularly in Los Angeles under her burlesque soloist stage name, Miss Katy Bunny.

Stone is writing partners with David Daitch, together they have developed television dramas for Sony, ABC and FOX. In 2020 they started their own production company, Daitch & Stone Distillery.

Filmography

TV series/internet productions

References

External links

1986 births
Living people
21st-century American actresses
Actresses from Tennessee
American film actresses
American television actresses
Actresses from Taipei
University of Southern California alumni
Actresses from Los Angeles